Enrique van Rysselberghe Martínez (22 August 1911 – 30 May 1984) was a Chilean architect and  politician, who was mayor of Concepción twice in the 1970s.

Biography

Family
He was born into a family whose origins go back to the engineer Max van Rysselberghe, son of François van Rysselberghe, a Belgian citizen. At the end of the 19th century, and less than 20 years old, Max participated in an expedition from Belgium to Antarctica, the Belgian Antarctic Expedition, which was originally supposed to last six months, but ended up lasting two years.

Once back in his country, Max met Isabel Martínez, daughter of Valentín Martínez, with whom he fell in love. They married and returned to Chile in 1905. They had four children: Lidia, Ivonne, Enrique and Daniel.

Enrique married Julieta Varela Santa María, a descendant of former president Domingo Santa María (1881-1886), and they had four children: Javier, Enrique, Ivonne, and Astrid.

Architect
Van Rysselberghe learned about engineering and architecture by studying texts in his father's library and later became an architect, although he never formally studied architecture. His works were tested by the 1939 Chillán earthquake, of 8.3 degrees, which hit Concepción with force, leaving almost 90% of the houses in the city destroyed. However, none of the ones he had built collapsed, so later, for reconstruction, many sought his services. He later went to work at the Directorate of Works of the municipality. At the same time, he made his fortune with businesses related to construction: he created a machine that allowed aggregates to be removed from the banks of the Biobío even during the rainy season, which made him the only one able to supply the different construction companies with sand all year round, quickly monopolizing the entire market in the area; he also developed a machine to clean the charcoal thrown away by the Lota miners, material that he got for free or at a very low cost.

Political career
In 1967 he was elected alderman as an independent for the commune of Concepción and, as he held the position of first alderman, he had to replace the then mayor Guillermo Aste Pérez on several occasions when he had to be absent from the city. In the 1971 elections he was re-elected, this time representing the National Party. As he obtained the first majority, he became mayor, a position he held until 1974, the year in which he unsuccessfully competed in the parliamentary elections for a deputy seat.

Due to the various social works carried out during his administration, the businessman and founder of Radio Bío Bío, baptized him El realizador. 

After the coup led by General Augusto Pinochet that overthrew the government of Salvador Allende in 1973, the military dictatorship appointed him mayor of Concepción, a position he held until 1979. He is remembered for his good management.

References

1911 births
1984 deaths
Chilean architects
20th-century Chilean politicians
People from Concepción, Chile
Chilean people of Belgian descent
Chilean people of Flemish descent
Chilean people of Dutch descent